Alena Vašková (married name Alena Neštická; born 8 November 1975) is a retired Czech tennis player.

She won eight singles and eleven doubles titles on the ITF Circuit. On 9 July 2001, she reached her best singles ranking of world No. 115. On 22 April 2002, she peaked at No. 135 in the doubles rankings.

In 2001, Vašková made two appearances for the Czech Republic in Fed Cup competition.

WTA career finals

Doubles: 1 (runner-up)

ITF Circuit finals

Singles: 14 (8–6)

Doubles: 19 (11–8)

External links
 
 
 

1975 births
Living people
People from Rožnov pod Radhoštěm
Czech female tennis players
Sportspeople from the Zlín Region